Hjalmar Johan Christoffersen (December 1, 1889 in Copenhagen – December 28, 1966 in Copenhagen) was a Danish amateur football (soccer) player, who played in the forward position. He played one game for the Denmark national football team, as they won a silver medal at the 1912 Summer Olympics. During his career, he most notably played for Boldklubben Frem.

References

External links
Danish national team profile
DatabaseOlympics profile

1889 births
1966 deaths
Danish men's footballers
Denmark international footballers
Boldklubben Frem players
Footballers at the 1912 Summer Olympics
Olympic footballers of Denmark
Olympic silver medalists for Denmark
Olympic medalists in football
Footballers from Copenhagen
Medalists at the 1912 Summer Olympics
Association football forwards